Semagystia alaica is a moth in the family Cossidae. It was described by Yakovlev in 2007. It is found in Kyrgyzstan.

The length of the forewings is 12–15 mm. The forewings are brownish black with a black border and yellowish scales. The hindwings are brown with a black border.

References

Natural History Museum Lepidoptera generic names catalog

Cossinae
Moths described in 2007